Urban Development Authority may also refer to:

Organizations and enterprises

India 
 Ahmedabad Urban Development Authority
 Anantapur–Hindupur Urban Development Authority
 Eluru Urban Development Authority
 Godavari Urban Development Authority
 Haryana Urban Development Authority
 Hyderabad Urban Development Authority
 Kakatiya Urban Development Authority
 Khammam Urban Development Authority
 Kurnool Urban Development Authority
 Mangalore Urban Development Authority
 Mysore Urban Development Authority
 Nellore Urban Development Authority
 Nizamabad Urban Development Authority
 Rajkot Urban Development Authority
 Satavahana Urban Development Authority
 Surat Urban Development Authority
 Tirupati Urban Development Authority
 Vadodara Urban Development Authority
 VGTM Urban Development Authority
 Visakhapatnam Urban Development Authority

Other 
 UDA Holdings - formerly Urban Development Authority of Malaysia, now a publicly listed company.
 Urban Redevelopment Authority (URA) - national urban planning authority of Singapore
 Urban Development Authority of Sri Lanka - Sri Lankan government ministry responsible for planning and implementation of economic, social, and physical development.